Matías de Irigoyen (25 February 1781 – 20 September 1839) was an Argentine soldier and politician.

Life 

Matías Ramón de Irigoyen de la Quintana was born in (Buenos Aires, Argentina, on 25 February 1781.
His parents were Ignacio Irigoyen Echenique (c. 11 March 1728 – 17 February 1787) and Francisca de la Quintana Riglos (24 Sep 1734 – 14 June 1815).
He was the second of 13 children.
His older brother was Miguel de Irigoyen (2 October 1764 – 11 June 1822).
He travelled to Spain as a child, entered the navy in his youth, and was wounded at the Battle of Trafalgar in 1805. He returned to Buenos Aires in 1809 and took part in the May Revolution in 1810.

Irigoyen was the first ambassador named by the revolutionary government, to be posted in Europe. After passing through Río de Janeiro, where he met the British ambassador, Lord Strangford, he traveled to London. After a relatively short stay he returned to Buenos Aires.

Between 18 and 20 April 1815 he was part along with José de San Martín and Manuel de Sarratea, of the short-lived Third Triumvirate, after the ousting of the Supreme Director Carlos María de Alvear. The naming of José Rondeau as Supreme Director ended this Triumvirate.

From October 1815 to 1816 he was designated Captain of the Port of Buenos Aires.

From 1817 to 1820 he served as Minister of War and Navy for the United Provinces of the Río de la Plata, during the governments of Juan Martín de Pueyrredón, José Rondeau and Juan Pedro Aguirre y López. After the Battle of Cepeda in February 1820, Irigoyen was named Governor-Mayor of Buenos Aires (9 to 11 February), but because of the dissolution of the Directorate and the formation of provincial governments, he was posted as provisional governor of the newly created Buenos Aires Province until the assumption of Manuel de Sarratea. He only occupied the post from 11 to 18 February 1820.

Matías de Irigoyen died in Buenos Aires on 20 September 1839.

Legacy 
The Argentine Navy named a ship after him, the aviso ARA Comandante General Irigoyen; now a museum ship.

References

Notes

Sources

Further reading 
  Lord Strangford, la Revolución de Mayo y las aspiraciones de sus protagonistas – "El Historiador" website (accessed 2016-07-18)

1781 births
1839 deaths
Argentine military personnel
People from Buenos Aires
People of the Argentine War of Independence
Governors of Buenos Aires Province
Government ministers of Argentina
Mayors of Buenos Aires